Lake Assad (Buhayrat al-Assad) is a reservoir on the Euphrates in Raqqa Governorate, Syria. It was created in 1974 when construction of the Tabqa Dam was completed. A vast network of canals uses water from Lake Assad to irrigate lands on both sides of the Euphrates. In addition, the lake provides drinking water for the city of Aleppo and supports a fishing industry. The shores of Lake Assad have developed into important ecological zones.

Project history 

The first plans for a dam in the Syrian part of the Euphrates date to 1927, but these were not carried out. In 1957, an agreement was reached with the Soviet Union for technical and financial aid for the construction of a dam in the Euphrates, and in 1960 a financial agreement was signed with West Germany. Another agreement to finance the project was signed with the Soviet Union in 1965. The project included a hydroelectric power station in the Tabqa Dam, and the construction of a vast irrigation network capable of irrigating  of land on both sides of the Euphrates. Construction of the dam lasted between 1968 and 1973 and the flooding of the reservoir commenced in 1974 by reducing the flow of the Euphrates. The project was completed under the presidency of Hafez al-Assad as part of his modernization policies and agricultural reforms.  In 1975, Iraq complained that the flow of the Euphrates had been reduced below an acceptable level and threatened to bomb the Tabqa Dam; mediation by Saudi Arabia and the Soviet Union eventually settled this dispute.

Rescue excavations in the Lake Assad region 

In anticipation of the reservoir forming, an intensive, international program of archaeological rescue excavations was carried out between 1963 and 1974. Excavations ranged in the date of sites: from the Late Natufian to the Ottoman Empire. Excavated sites include Tell Abu Hureyra, Emar, Habuba Kabira, Mureybet, Tell es-Sweyhat, Tell Fray and Dibsi Faraj. At Qal'at Ja'bar, a castle on a hilltop later turned into an island, a protective glacis was built and two minarets at Mureybet and Meskene were relocated beyond the flood zone.

Characteristics 
The proposed irrigation scheme suffered from a number of problems, including the high gypsum content in the reclaimed soils around Lake Assad, soil salinization, the collapse of canals that distributed the water from Lake Assad, and the unwillingness of farmers to resettle in the reclaimed areas. As a result, only  were irrigated from Lake Assad in 1984. The lake also supports a fishing industry.

The western shore of the lake has developed into an important marshland area. On the southeastern shore, some areas have been reforested with evergreen trees including the Aleppo pine and the Euphrates poplar. Lake Assad is an important wintering location for migratory birds and the government before 2004 undertook measures to protect certain shore areas from hunters by downgrading access roads. The island of Jazirat al-Thawra has been designated a nature reserve.

During the Syrian Civil War, water levels in Lake Assad have dropped significantly. This drop is possibly caused by the power station of the Tabqa Dam, which pumps more water out of the lake than is supplied by the Euphrates.

See also 

Baath Dam
Tishrin Dam
Water resources management in Syria

References 

Euphrates
Assad
Raqqa Governorate

de:Assadsee